Michael James Norris (born 6 October 1954) is a former  Australian rules footballer who played with South Melbourne in the Victorian Football League (VFL).

After ten games across three seasons with South Melbourne, Norris moved to Melbourne in 1975 but did not play a senior game for them. Norris subsequently enjoyed a highly successful period with Mordialloc in the Victorian Football Association, scoring over 40 goals in each of his three seasons at the club and winning the VFA Division 2 premiership in 1977.

Notes

External links 

Michael Norris's playing statistics from The VFA Project

Michael Norris at demonwiki

Living people
1954 births
Australian rules footballers from Victoria (Australia)
Sydney Swans players
Ormond Amateur Football Club players